Rear-Admiral Sir Alexander Henry Charles Gordon-Lennox  (9 April 1911 – 4 July 1987) was a Royal Navy officer who became President of the Royal Naval College, Greenwich.

Naval career
Born the son of Major Lord Bernard Gordon-Lennox, Gordon-Lennox joined the Royal Navy in 1924. He served in the Middle East, in East Coast convoys and in Arctic convoys during the Second World War. He became Commanding Officer of the sloop HMS Mermaid as well as Captain of the 2nd Frigate Squadron in 1954. He went on to become Commander of the signal school HMS Mercury in 1955, Flag Captain commanding the cruiser HMS Newcastle during the Malayan Emergency in 1957 and Deputy Chief of Supplies and Transport at the Admiralty in 1959.

His last appointment was as President of the Royal Naval College, Greenwich in 1961 before retiring in 1962. He was admitted a Companion of the Order of the Bath (CB) in the 1962 New Year Honours

In retirement he was Serjeant-at-Arms of the House of Commons between 1961 and 1976 and was appointed a Knight Commander of the Royal Victorian Order (KCVO) in the 1972 New Year Honours.

Marriage and family
Gordon-Lennox married Barbara Steele in 1936. They had two sons who both followed Royal Navy careers:

 Michael (b. 1938) became a captain and m. Jennifer Gibbs, a lady-in-waiting to the Queen Mother and later to the Queen.
 Andrew (b. 1948) became a Commander and a Defence and Naval Attaché. He married Julia Morrison.

References

1911 births
1987 deaths
Royal Navy rear admirals
Knights Commander of the Royal Victorian Order
Companions of the Order of the Bath
Companions of the Distinguished Service Order
Admiral presidents of the Royal Naval College, Greenwich
Serjeants-at-Arms of the British House of Commons